Boulazac (Limousin: Bolasac) is a former commune in the Dordogne department in southwestern France. On 1 January 2016, it was merged into the new commune Boulazac Isle Manoire.

Population

Sport
The Boulazac Basket Dordogne (BBD) is a French basketball club, based in Boulazac.

See also
Communes of the Dordogne département

References

Sister Cities 

 Bibbiena, Italy

Former communes of Dordogne